Joachim Scholtz 'Joggie' Jansen  (born 5 February 1948) is a former South African rugby union player.

Playing career

Jansen made his test debut for the Springboks in 1970 against New Zealand at Loftus Versfeld in Pretoria and played in all four tests during the series against the touring All Blacks. Jansen also gained fame in his first Test for his excellent tackle on All Black flyhalf Wayne Cottrell, that helped swing the momentum of the game in favour of the Springboks. In 1971 he played in the test series against France and Australia. His last test match was the losing test against England in 1972. He played in a further five tour matches, scoring five tries to add to his one test try for the Springboks.

Test history

See also
List of South Africa national rugby union players – Springbok no. 444

References

1948 births
Living people
South African rugby union players
South Africa international rugby union players
Free State Cheetahs players
People from Siyancuma Local Municipality
Rugby union players from the Northern Cape
Rugby union centres